NGC 3184, the Little Pinwheel Galaxy, is a spiral galaxy approximately 40 million light-years away in the constellation Ursa Major.  It has two HII regions named NGC 3180 and NGC 3181.

NGC 3184 houses a high abundance of heavy elements and SN 1999gi, a magnitude 14 Type II supernova detected on December 9, 1999.  Other supernovae in NGC 3184 include 1921B (mag 13.5), 1921C (mag 11) and 1937F (mag 13.5).

The blue color of its spiral arms comes mostly from relatively few bright young blue stars. The bright stars that highlight the arms were created in huge density waves that circle the center.

Structure
NGC 3184 has two prominent spiral arms. They have constant pitch angles, which makes them both symmetrical.

SN 2010dn 
On May 31, 2010, Koichi Itagaki detected a magnitude 17 optical transient 33" east and 61" north of the center of NGC 3184 at coordinates 10 18 19.89 +41 26 28.8.  This event may be an outbursting luminous blue variable (LBV) star.  Archival Hubble and Spitzer images of NGC 3184 seem to show no progenitor for optical transient SN 2010dn.  SN 2010dn is just like SN 2008S and NGC 300-OT. On day 2, SN 2010dn had an unfiltered magnitude of 17.1, corresponding to a peak absolute magnitude of roughly -13.3.

See also
 Pinwheel Galaxy
Bode's galaxy
Cigar galaxy
NGC 2787

References

External links

 
 Spiral Galaxy NGC 3184 & Supernova 1999gi (20-inch F/8.1 Ritchey Chretien Cassegrain)
 Supernova 1999gi in NGC 3184 (supernovae.net)
 Discovery image of SN2010dn (2010-05-31 mag 17.5) /  Wikisky DSS2 and SDSS zoom-in of the same region

Galaxies discovered in 1787
3184
05557
Unbarred spiral galaxies
Ursa Major (constellation)
17870318
19991209
030087